Cabera leptographa is a species of moth, belonging to the genus Cabera.

It is native to the Palearctic.

References

External links

Caberini
Moths described in 1936